Internet identity may refer to:

 Online identity, a social identity that an Internet user establishes online 
 Digital identity, information used by systems to represent an external agent
 IID (company), formerly Internet Identity